Olympiakos Neon Liosion is a Greek football club based in Ilion, Greece.  The team was founded in 1952, when the city was named Nea Liosia.  The home stadium of the team is the National Sports Center Of Ilion.

They team participated seven times in the Football League (Greece) between  1974 and 1981.

Achievements

Record without relegations: 27 seasons (between 1952 and 1979)
Athens First Division (EPSA) winner (2):
1994-95, 2006-07 (co-champion)
Athens First Division (EPSA) second place: 1966-67 and 1972-73 (entries into the Second Division), 1991-92 (entry into the Third Division)

References

External links
 Official website
erasitexniki-podosgfairo.gr 
Olympiakos Neon Liosion blog
Maties sta Spor («Ματιές στα Σπορ» = Eyes on the Sport) 1979-1994 editions

Association football clubs established in 1952
1952 establishments in Greece
Football clubs in Attica